Phaea marthae is a species of beetle in the family Cerambycidae. It was described by Chemsak in 1977. It is known to be from Mexico.

References

marthae
Beetles described in 1977